City Hall Historic District is a national historic district located at Rochester in Monroe County, New York. The district consists of four buildings arranged in a 19th-century civic complex. The buildings are the Rochester City Hall (1874–1875), Monroe County Courthouse (1894–1896), Rochester Free Academy (1872–1873), and St. Luke's Episcopal Church (1824). Andrew Jackson Warner designed the City Hall and Free Academy buildings. His son, J. Foster Warner, designed the Monroe County Courthouse.

The National Register of Historic Places listed it in 1974.

See also
 National Register of Historic Places listings in Rochester, New York

References

Historic districts in Rochester, New York
Gothic Revival architecture in New York (state)
Renaissance Revival architecture in New York (state)
Historic districts on the National Register of Historic Places in New York (state)
National Register of Historic Places in Rochester, New York